Fugitive Lady may refer to:

Fugitive Lady (1934 film), American crime romance
Fugitive Lady (1938 film), British title of American crime romance Female Fugitive
Fugitive Lady (1950 film), British-Italian crime drama